The siege of Stralsund  was a siege laid on Stralsund by Albrecht von Wallenstein's Imperial Army during the Thirty Years' War, from 13 May 1628 to 4 August 1628.  Stralsund was aided by Denmark and Sweden, with considerable Scottish participation. The lifting of the siege ended Wallenstein's series of victories, and contributed to his downfall. The Swedish garrison in Stralsund was the first on German soil in history. The battle marked the de facto entrance of Sweden into the war.

Prelude

Belligerents
Christian IV of Denmark had declared war on the Holy Roman Empire in 1625. He then invaded the empire with an army commanded by Ernst von Mansfeld to oppose the Catholic League's army commanded by Johann Tserclaes, Count of Tilly. In response, Ferdinand II, Holy Roman Emperor, had Albrecht von Wallenstein raise an additional army to support Tilly. Wallenstein defeated Mansfeld in the Battle of Dessau Bridge in 1626. The remnants of Mansfeld's army left Central Germany, and turned to Silesia and Hungary to regroup with Gabriel Bethlen's forces.

After Tilly had defeated Christian IV in the Battle of Lutter am Barenberge in August 1626, and Bethlen was neutralized in the (third) Peace of Pressburg in December, Tilly and Wallenstein were able to subsequently expel Christian IV from the North German plain, organized in the Lower Saxon and Upper Saxon imperial circles, and pressure him even in Danish Jutland. The internally divided Upper Saxon circle, to which the Duchy of Pomerania with Stralsund belonged, was incapable of self-defence and had formally declared neutrality.

Christian IV's army staff heavily relied on Scottish expertise: with 300 Scottish officers in his service, Scottish officers outnumbered Danish and Norwegian officers combined by 3:1. Also, Christian IV had issued patents to raise 9,000 Scottish troops in 1627, adding to 2,000-3,000 Scottish troops raised by Donald Mackay for Ernst von Mansfeld's army, but who had been deployed to Denmark instead.

Gustavus Adolphus of Sweden was since 1626 involved in the Polish-Swedish War, with Poland allied to the Holy Roman Empire. In this war, Scotsman Alexander Leslie started his career in Swedish service as commandant and governor of Pillau in East Prussia. Gustavus Adolphus had made plans to intervene in the Holy Roman Empire, of which the Riksdag commission approved in the winter of 1627/28.

Situation in Pomerania

In November 1627, the Duchy of Pomerania had capitulated to the forces of the Holy Roman Empire. Bogislaw XIV, Duke of Pomerania, on 10 November signed the Capitulation of Franzburg with Hans Georg von Arnim, who on behalf of Albrecht von Wallenstein commanded the imperial occupation forces in Pomerania. With the occupation, Wallenstein sought to secure the southern coastline of the Baltic Sea for Ferdinand II, Holy Roman Emperor against Christian IV of Denmark.

The Capitulation of Franzburg required all towns except for ducal residences to take in imperial troops, and Wallenstein had ordered Arnim to occupy the Pomeranian ports and seize their vessels already in October. Stralsund however was unwilling to give in, as its status as a Hanseatic town had provided for considerable self-determination and independence from the Pomeranian dukes. Thus, Stralsund ignored Bogislaw's order to adhere to the capitulation, issued since February 1628, and instead turned first to Denmark and then to Sweden for support.

Siege

Starting in May 1628, siege was laid on Stralsund by Albrecht von Wallenstein's troops, commanded by Hans Georg von Arnim. By then, the town with its 20,000 inhabitants was defended by a citizen force of 2,500, a levy of 1,500, and another 1,000 enlisted men. The first major imperial assault on the city took place between 16 and 24 May.

Christian IV of Denmark had reacted positively to Stralsund's call and deployed a force including 900 of Mackay's Scotsmen, organized in seven companies, and a company of Germans in her defence. Though dispatched already on 8 May, they only landed on 24 May. Initially, the Danish-German mercenary Heinrich Holk was appointed governor. When Holk retired to seek reinforcements, he was succeeded by Scotsman Lieutenant Colonel Alexander Seaton of Mackay's Regiment.

The Imperial army renewed its assault on 26 and 27 May. When checked, Arnim resorted to bombardment awaiting Wallenstein's personal appearance.

On 20 June, a Swedish auxiliary expedition, dispatched already on 2 June, arrived with 600 men commanded by Colonel Fretz, Colonel James MacDougall, and Major Semple.

On 23 or 25 June, Stralsund concluded an alliance with Gustavus Adolphus of Sweden, scheduled to last twenty years. Gustavus Adolphus then stationed a garrison in the town, the first such on German soil in history. This event marked the starting point of Swedish engagement in the Thirty Years' War. Robert Monro recorded that Semple was killed almost upon arrival and Macdougall temporarily captured. However he noted that this Swedish contingent "did come voluntarily come to succour and help our Nation" indicating the sheer number of Scots from both the standing Danish garrison and the Swedish relief force.

On 27 June, Wallenstein took command of the besieging forces, and renewed the assaults starting the very same night. The Scottish troops, entrusted with the defence of a crucial section of Stralsund's fortifications, distinguished themselves by an extremely fierce way of fighting. The main assault was on the eastern district of Franken, commanded by major Robert Monro. Of 900 Scots, 500 were killed and 300 wounded, including Monro. Rosladin was able to relieve Monro's force and re-take lost ground. An overall 2,000 defenders were killed and captured in this assault. Monro later recalled that "we were not suffered to come off our posts for our ordinary recreation, nor yet to sleepe" - for a period of six weeks.

The following night, on 28 and 29 June, Wallenstein succeeded in taking the outer works of the fortifications. Rosladin was wounded and governor Seaton took over his command.

On 29 June, Bogislaw XIV, Duke of Pomerania sent two of his high-ranking nobles, the count von Putbus and his chancellor von Horn, to persuade Stralsund to adhere to the Capitulation of Franzburg and surrender to Wallenstein. On 30 June, Rosladin persuaded the city not to enter into negotiations with Wallenstein, who had resorted to bombardment again. The same day, ten Swedish vessels reinforced Stralsund with 600 troops, while under heavy fire by Wallenstein's forces. Soon after, Christian ordered another Scottish regiment, that of Alexander Lindsay, 2nd Lord Spynie, to help with the defence of the town. These troops arrived around 4 July and suffered huge casualties (being reduced from a regiment to four companies) in the ensuing assaults, many led by Wallenstein in person. On 10 July, Wallenstein and Stralsund negotiated a treaty in the Hainholz woods northwest of the town, requiring Stralsund to take in Pomeranian troops. The treaty was signed by Wallenstein and Bogislaw XIV on 21 July, but not by Stralsund. Though Bogislaw vouched for the town, the treaty did not come into effect.

Already on 2 July, Stralsund had been reinforced by 400 Danish troops, and by 1,100 troops of the Danish-Scottish regiments of Donald Mackay and Alexander Lindsay, 2nd Lord Spynie in the following week. By the 17 July Scotsman Alexander Leslie, arrived with 1,100 troops, including more Scottish volunteers, and succeeded Seaton as Stralsund's governor. Leslie commanded a total of 4,000 to 5,000 troops. The Danish support amounted to 2,650 troops deployed during the siege. One of Leslie's first actions was an audacious all-out assault on the besieging troops which Robert Monro described as follows:

Sir Alexander Leslie being made governour, he resolved for the credit of his countrymen to make an out-fall upon the Enemy, and desirous to conferre the credit on his own Nation alone, being his first Essay in that Citie

Heavy rainfall between 21 and 24 July turned the battlefield into a marsh. On 4 August, Wallenstein lifted the siege, acknowledging his first misfortune in the Thirty Years' War.

Aftermath
After the unsuccessful siege, Wallenstein headed to nearby Wolgast, to fight a final battle with Christian IV: Danish troops had landed in the area and occupied the island of Usedom, and had taken the town of Wolgast on 14 August without fighting. On 22 August, Wallenstein retook the town.

Also in August, Swedish chancellor Axel Oxenstierna came to Stralsund, and offered negotiations to Wallenstein. The latter however refused. The inability to take Stralsund was to become one of the obstacles which led to Wallenstein's temporary dismissal in 1630.

When Gustavus Adolphus' invaded Pomerania in June 1630, he used his bridgehead in Stralsund to clear the flanks of his landing forces. Bogislaw XIV concluded an alliance with the Swedish king in the Treaty of Stettin in July. Wallenstein's forces were subsequently driven out of the Duchy of Pomerania, and Swedish forces had taken complete control of the duchy when Wallenstein's forces in Greifswald surrendered in June 1631.

During the Swedish campaign, Alexander Leslie was succeeded as the governor of Stralsund by another Scot in Swedish service, James MacDougal, in 1630. From 1679 to 1697, the position was to pass to yet another Scot, Peter Maclean.

Part of Wallenstein's forces were infected with the Black Death. During the siege, the epidemics swept into the town, killing 2,000 in the months of August and September alone.

The battle of Stralsund entered Pomeranian folklore. The population of Stralsund commemorates the siege of 1628 with an annual festival, "Wallensteintage" ("Wallenstein Days").

Gallery

See also
Pomerania during the Early Modern Age
Thirty Years' War
Capitulation of Franzburg
Duchy of Pomerania
Swedish Pomerania
Scotland and the Thirty Years' War

Notes

Sources

References

Bibliography

Grosjean, Alexia An Unofficial Alliance: Scotland and Sweden, 1569-1654 (Leiden, 2003)

Riis, Thomas, Should Auld Acquaintance Be Forgot (2 vols., Odense, 1988)

External links
Digitalized collection of primary sources about the siege by Johann Albert Dinnies from the Stralsund archives
Konze, M. and R. Samariter ‘Momentaufnahme aus dem Dreißigjährigen Krieg: Das Stralsunder Söldnergrab von 1628’ 

1628 in Europe
Stralsund 1628
Stralsund 1628
Stralsund 1628
Stralsund 1628
Conflicts in 1628
History of Pomerania
Stralsund
Albrecht von Wallenstein
Battles in Mecklenburg-Western Pomerania